Jóvenes Clásicos del Son (Spanish for "young classics of Son") is a Cuban septet with double bass, tres-guitar, guitar, trumpet, congas, bongos and singer. The musical director is Ernesto Reyes Proenza.

Discography
 Fruta Bomba (Fruta Bomba on Tumi Music, 1999)
 No Pueden Parar, 2000
 Tambor en el Alma (Tambor en el Alma on Tumi Music, 2003)
 Menos jóvenes, más clásicos (Abdala Records, 2006)
 Cantan en Llano, 2012
 Pedacito De Mi Vida, 2014
 El Bar de Paco, 2016
 

Cuban musical groups
Son cubano groups
Musical groups established in 1994
1994 establishments in Cuba
Septets